Personal Column may refer to:

 Personal advertisement
 "Personal Column" (TV series), Australia
 Personal Column (film), France
 Lured, also known as Personal Column, remake of the French film